Mason Lino (born 4 February 1994) is a Samoan professional rugby league footballer who plays as a  and  for Wakefield Trinity in the Betfred Super League and Samoa at the international level.

He previously played for the New Zealand Warriors and the Newcastle Knights in the NRL.

Background
Lino was born in Apia, Samoa.

Early years
Lino was a Marist Saints junior and attended Avondale College.

Lino is of Samoan and Chinese descent.

Playing career

2012
Lino trialled for the New Zealand Warriors' NYC squad in 2012, earning a place in the squad. He finished the season as the team's top points-scorer with 144 points in 23 games. He attended an NRL rookie camp on the 24 and 25 November 2012.

2013
Lino scored 147 points for the Junior Warriors in 2013, taking his total to 281 from 41 appearances. The side lost the 2013 Holden Cup Grand Final 30-42. He also played for the Junior Kiwis in their 26-38 defeat by the Junior Kangaroos on 13 October 2013.

He was named in the Samoan train-on squad for the 2013 Rugby League World Cup. He did not make the squad after the cut to 25 players.

2014
In 2014, he co-captained the Junior Warriors Holden Cup team in their 34-32 grand final victory over the Brisbane Broncos, kicking five conversions out of six and finishing the match on the pitch despite suffering a partial shoulder dislocation. He finished his Holden Cup career with 503 points from 62 appearances, becoming the third most-capped Junior Warrior behind Ben Henry and John Palavi.

2015
Lino had signed with AS Carcassonne for the 2015 season, but the contract was cancelled after his shoulder dislocation in the 2014 Holden Cup grand final. Instead, Lino re-signed with the Warriors, for 2015, to play in their New South Wales Cup squad.

He made his NRL debut on 22 August 2015 against the North Queensland Cowboys, replacing an injured Chad Townsend.

2016
On 8 October, Lino made his international debut for Samoa in their test match against Fiji in Apia.

2017
Lino played for the Warriors in the 2017 NRL Auckland Nines.

In June, Lino signed a further two-year contract, committing both parties until the end of the 2019 season.

On 28 August 2017, Lino was named in The 2017 Intrust Super Premiership NSW team of the year.

2018
Lino played in 8 NRL games for the Warriors in the 2018 season. In September, he signed a 2-year contract with the Newcastle Knights starting in 2019.

2019
In Lino's first season for the Knights, he debuted in round 4 against the St. George Illawarra Dragons. He played 12 games for the Knights, scored two tries and kicked 33 goals.

2020
In 2020, Lino only managed to play in five games for Newcastle before being released at the end of the season.

In November, he signed a three-year contract with Super League side Wakefield Trinity starting in 2021.

References

External links
Newcastle Knights profile
New Zealand Warriors profile
NRL profile

1994 births
Living people
Junior Kiwis players
Marist Saints players
New Zealand people of Chinese descent
New Zealand expatriate sportspeople in England
New Zealand Warriors players
Newcastle Knights players
People educated at Avondale College
Rugby league five-eighths
Rugby league halfbacks
Samoa national rugby league team players
Samoan sportspeople
Samoan emigrants to New Zealand
Samoan people of Chinese descent
Samoan rugby league players
Sportspeople from Apia
Sportspeople of Chinese descent